The 2021 San Francisco Shock season will be the fourth season of the San Francisco Shock's existence in the Overwatch League and their third under head coach Park "Crusty" Dae-hee. The team enters the season as the defending back-to-back Overwatch League champions after winning the 2019 and 2020 Grand Finals.

Preceding offseason

Roster changes 

The Shock entered free agency with four free agents.

Acquisitions 
The Shock's first offseason acquisition was Brice "FDGod" Monsçavoir, a support player widely regarded as one of the best Western main support players, who was acquired from the Paris Eternal on November 12, 2020. The team's next acquisition was Charlie "Nero" Zwarg, a damage player coming off a season with the Guangzhou Charge in which he did not see much playing time due to visa issues amidst the COVID-19 pandemic, who was signed on November 30. The next day, they signed Lim "Glister" Gil-seong, a damage hitscan specialist coming off his rookie season with the London Spitfire.

Releases 
Two of the Shock's four free agents did not return, both of which signed with other teams, beginning with support player Grant "Moth" Espe, who signed with the Los Angeles Gladiators on November 12, 2020. On March 15, 2021, damage player Kim "Rascal" Dong-jun signed with the Philadelphia Fusion. Outside of free agency, damage player Lee "ANS" Seon-chang announced his retirement on January 8, 2021, after one season with the team.

Regular season

May Melee 
The Shock began their 2021 season on April 16, playing against the Los Angeles Gladiators in the May Melee qualifiers. Despite losing the first map of the match, they won their season opener against the Gladiators 3–1. They lost their next game against the defending Houston Outlaws in a six-map series, thanks in part to a game-winning Reinhardt Earthshatter by the Outlaws' Myung-heum "Jjanggu" Cho to close out the series.

Final roster

Transactions 
Transactions of/for players on the roster during the 2021 regular season:
On June 23, damage player Kwon "Striker" Nam-joo retired.
On June 23, the Shock signed damage player Lee "ANS" Seon-chang.

Standings

Game log

Regular season 

|2021 season schedule

Postseason

References 

San Francisco Shock
2021 in San Francisco
San Francisco Shock
San Francisco Shock seasons